Tera van Beilen (born March 30, 1993) is a Canadian competition swimmer and Olympian.

In the 2010 Summer Youth Olympics in Singapore, Van Beilen won a gold medal in the women's 100-metre breaststroke and a silver in the 200-metre breaststroke.

In 2012, while competing in the Canadian Olympic trials in Montreal, Van Beilen had qualified for the Olympics. She placed first with a time of 2:24.03, ahead of Canadian swimmer Martha McCabe with a time of 2:24.81.  Van Beilen's timing placed her second in the world for 2012, behind the 2:22.73 time of reigning American Olympic champion Rebecca Soni.

During the 2012 Summer Olympics in London, Van Beilen received much attention as a Canadian Olympian. She participated in the women's 100-metre and 200-metre breaststroke categories, as well as the women's 4x100-metre medley relay.  While competing in the women's 100-metre breaststroke, she proceeded to the semi-finals, only to be eliminated in a swim-off with Alia Atkinson of Jamaica.

Outside of the 2012 Olympic Games, Van Beilen competes regularly in local, provincial, and international level swimming competitions.  She is currently attending the University of British Columbia studying kinesiology, and is an active member of the UBC Thunderbirds university swimming team.  She has also achieved personal bests of 1:07.37 in the 100-metre breaststroke, and 2:24.03 in the 200-metre breaststroke.

References

External links
 
 
 
 
 
 

1993 births
Living people
Canadian female breaststroke swimmers
Olympic swimmers of Canada
Youth Olympic gold medalists for Canada
Swimmers at the 2010 Summer Youth Olympics
Swimmers at the 2012 Summer Olympics
Commonwealth Games bronze medallists for Canada
Commonwealth Games medallists in swimming
Swimmers at the 2014 Commonwealth Games
Pan American Games silver medalists for Canada
Pan American Games medalists in swimming
Swimmers at the 2015 Pan American Games
Medalists at the 2015 Pan American Games
Universiade medalists in swimming
Universiade silver medalists for Canada
Medalists at the 2011 Summer Universiade
UBC Thunderbirds swimmers
Swimmers from Mississauga
Youth Olympic silver medalists for Canada
Youth Olympic bronze medalists for Canada
20th-century Canadian women
21st-century Canadian women
Medallists at the 2014 Commonwealth Games